Robert A. J. Gagnon (born July 31, 1958) is an American theological writer, professor of New Testament Theology at Houston Baptist University (since 2018), former associate professor of the New Testament at the Pittsburgh Theological Seminary (1994-2017), an expert on biblical homosexuality, and an elder in the Presbyterian Church (U.S.A.). He holds a BA from Dartmouth, an MTS from Harvard Divinity School, and a PhD from the Princeton Theological Seminary.

Gagnon's primary fields are Pauline theology and sexuality. Gagnon has focused on the issue of The Bible and homosexuality. Gagnon has been described by theologian James V. Brownson as "the foremost traditionalist interpreter" on this topic, and has published several books and articles about the subject. Gagnon's work on homosexuality is derived from Old and New Testament texts dealing with sexuality. Gagnon's arguments are based on reproductive biology and gender complementarity, in which Gagnon presents and interprets modern scholarship on the ancient texts. Gagnon's use of arguments based on "natural law" has been criticized by Jack Bartlett Rogers as applying a "nonbiblical standard" and claiming "that all people who are homosexual have willfully chosen that behavior and therefore can successfully change their sexual identity," although Gagnon responds that this is an "outrageous misrepresentation" of his views. In the coauthored book Homosexuality and the Bible, Gagnon presents a conservative side of the debate on homosexuality and the church, while Dan O. Via, Professor Emeritus of New Testament at Duke Divinity School, presents an opposing view.

In his paper Why the 'Weak' at Rome Cannot Be Non-Christian Jews, Gagnon disputes work by Mark D. Nanos, who argues that Paul the Apostle was a Torah-observant follower of Judaism.

One of the authors of The Encyclopedia of Christian Civilization, New Dictionary of Christian Apologetics,  Dictionary for Theological Interpretation of the Bible, and Oxford Handbook of Evangelical Theology.

Works

Thesis

Books

Articles and chapters

References

External links 

 Dr. Robert A.J. Gagnon (Official website)

American theologians
1958 births
Living people
Dartmouth College alumni
Harvard Divinity School alumni
Princeton Theological Seminary alumni
American Calvinist and Reformed theologians
American Presbyterians
Pittsburgh Theological Seminary faculty
Houston Christian University faculty
Tufts University faculty
Middlebury College faculty